Donald Steven (born 26 May 1945) is a Canadian-American composer, music educator, and academic administrator. An associate composer of the Canadian Music Centre, he won a BMI Student Composer Award in 1970, the Canadian Federation of University Women's Golden Jubilee Creative Arts Award in 1972, the 1987 Juno Award for Classical Composition of the Year (for Pages of Solitary Delights) and the 1991 Jules Léger Prize for New Chamber Music (for In the Land of Pure Delight). His musical compositions are characterized by their emphasis on instrumental colour and atmosphere. Perhaps his most well known piece is his Illusions for solo cello, which has been widely performed in concert and on television and radio broadcasts.

Life and career
Born in Montreal, he attended Selwyn House School, followed by Ashbury College. He began his career performing and arranging folk and rock music in the 1960s (most notably with The Raftsmen) before pursuing professional studies in music. In 1968 he entered McGill University where he was a music composition student of Bruce Mather. After graduating from McGill with a Bachelor of Music in 1972, he entered the graduate music program at Princeton University where he studied under Milton Babbitt, earning a Master of Fine Arts in 1974. He later earned a Doctor of Philosophy from Princeton.

In 1975 Steven joined the Faculty of Music (now the Schulich School of Music) at McGill University, ultimately becoming the head of the performance department in 1986. He taught music composition at the school until 1992 and was involved in the modernization of McGill's studio for electronic music and the creation of the computer music studios. In 1992 he became dean of the Conservatory of Music at Purchase College and, subsequently in 1997, founding dean of the College of the Performing Arts at Roosevelt University. He has since worked in senior administration at the State University of New York and The Citadel, and retired as Provost and Vice President for Academic Affairs at Rider University in 2013. He is also a former faculty member of the University of Western Ontario.

Steven's works have been performed throughout the world, including the World Music Days of the International Society for Contemporary Music and the World Cello Congress. He has received numerous commissions, including from Maureen Forrester, Tsuyoshi Tsutsumi, Bertram Turetzky, Robert Riseling, and Alvaro Pierri, and from La Société de musique contemporaine du Québec, Répercussion, the Pierrot Ensemble, the Canadian Electronic Ensemble, New Music Concerts and the Canadian Broadcasting Corporation.

Selected works

 Harbinger, a fantasia for soprano and orchestra, 1969 (BMI Award for Student Composers), 1969
 Illusions, an elegy for solo cello, 1971
 The Gossamer Cathedral, five surrealistic frescoes for chamber ensemble, 1972
 Crossroads, for chamber ensemble, 1974
 The Transient, for soprano and chamber ensemble, 1975
 Images: Refractions of Time and Space, for flute, electric piano, electric bass and percussion, 1977
 For Madmen Only, magic theatre for solo cello and orchestra, 1978
 Rainy Day Afternoon, for brass quintet, 1979
 Night Suite, for chamber ensemble, 1979
 Wired, electronic ensemble and optional tape, 1981
 On the Down Side, for jazz septet, 1982
 Bert in Nether-Nether Land, adventures for solo contrabass and ensemble, 1983
 Ordre sans ordre (sans désordre), concerto for solo guitar and chamber orchestra, 1984
 Straight on Till Morning, for chamber ensemble and tape, 1985
 Pages of Solitary Delights, for contralto and orchestra, 1985 (Juno Award 1987)
 Sapphire Song, for solo clarinet, 1986
 Love Where the Nights are Long, for soprano, oboe d'amore and orchestra, 1987
 Full Valleys, for children's choir, 1989
 Orbits, for four percussionists and tape, 1989
 That Other Shore, for solo contrabass and low strings, 1990
 In the Land of Pure Delight, for chamber ensemble, 1991 (Jules Léger Prize 1991)
 ô, to make dreames true, miniatures for the Harry Partch Instrumentarium, 2001
 mesmerie0000-mesmerie0100, five computer-generated etudes, 2008
 GearTrain, computer-generated isorhythmic motet, 2008
 ScatterToms, computer-generated electronic music, 2013
 Evensong, computer-generated electronic music, 2015
 Generations, computer-generated electronic and ambient music, 2015
 Au Bord des Flots, Scènes Acadiennes d'autrefois pour trois jeunes ami(e)s de la clarinette, 2015
 Anamnesis, for two shakuhachi, 2016
 souvenirs d'autrefois, three bagatelles for clarinet and bassoon, 2016
 October, for solo alto flute, 2017
 Dusk, for shakuhachi and chamber ensemble, 2020

References

The Canadian Encyclopedia
Canadian Music Centre
la Société de musique contemporaine du Québec
Counterpoint Music Library Services, Inc.
Library of Congress online catalog
A History of the McGill Electronic Music Studio

External links
Project MUSE - Computer Music Journal - Compositional Crossroads: Music, McGill, Montreal (review) 
Impartial Music at SoundCloud

1945 births
Living people
Canadian male composers
Jules Léger Prize for New Chamber Music winners
Canadian classical composers
Juno Award for Classical Composition of the Year winners
McGill University School of Music alumni
Academic staff of McGill University
Musicians from Montreal
Princeton University alumni
Rider University faculty
Roosevelt University faculty
State University of New York faculty
Academic staff of the University of Western Ontario